is a Japanese manga author. She is known for creating characters with cute appearances, and even provided chibi illustrations for characters in Sister Princess and Strawberry Panic! in the Japanese bishōjo magazine Dengeki G's Magazine.

Works
Boku × Neko?
Di Gi ★ A La Mode
Di Gi Charat Theater: Dejiko's Adventure (English: September 2004)
HaniComi The 4-panel
Tenshi no Hane to Akuma no Shippo

References

External links
Yuki Kiriga's personal website 

Living people
Manga artists
Women manga artists
Japanese female comics artists
Female comics writers
Japanese women writers
Year of birth missing (living people)
Joshibi University of Art and Design alumni